Osawatomie State Hospital is a psychiatric hospital established in 1863 and opened in 1866 in Osawatomie, Kansas. It has been named "Kansas Insane Asylum" and the "State Insane Asylum" but was officially changed to its present name in 1901.

References

External links

Publications concerning Osawatomie State Hospital available via the KGI Online Library

Hospital buildings completed in 1855
Psychiatric hospitals in Kansas
Buildings and structures in Miami County, Kansas